Betula Beach is a summer village on Wabamun Lake in Alberta, Canada.

Demographics 

In the 2016 Census of Population conducted by Statistics Canada, the Summer Village of Betula Beach had a population of 16 living in 7 of its 40 total private dwellings, a  change from its 2011 population of 10.

See also 
List of communities in Alberta
List of summer villages in Alberta
List of resort villages in Saskatchewan

References

External links 

1960 establishments in Alberta
Edmonton Metropolitan Region
Summer villages in Alberta